Wilford Scypion (July 18, 1958 – February 27, 2014) was an American professional boxer.

Amateur career
Scypion was the National Golden Gloves Middleweight Champion in 1978.

Pro career
In February 1983, Scypion beat Frank Fletcher by a twelve round decision to take the USBA's regional Middleweight title. This victory guaranteed him a world championship fight, against Marvelous Marvin Hagler. The two competitors met on May 27, in a fight televised by HBO Boxing, which was considered by many to show only the best fights available at the time. Scypion was knocked out in the fourth round in his only world title attempt, which was held in Providence, Rhode Island.  It was the first bout to simultaneously decide the WBA, WBC and IBF titles in history.  In the ninth round of a bout at Madison Square Garden on November 23, 1979, Scypion made his 13th knockout in 13 pro fights, but inadvertently caused the fatal injury of Willie Classen, who died five days later without having regained consciousness.

Death
Scypion died on February 27, 2014, from complications of pneumonia.  He was 55.

Professional boxing record

|-
| style="text-align:center;" colspan="8"|32 Wins (24 knockouts, 8 decisions), 9 Losses (5 knockouts, 4 decisions) 
|-  style="text-align:center; background:#e3e3e3;"
|  style="border-style:none none solid solid; "|Result
|  style="border-style:none none solid solid; "|Record
|  style="border-style:none none solid solid; "|Opponent
|  style="border-style:none none solid solid; "|Type
|  style="border-style:none none solid solid; "|Round
|  style="border-style:none none solid solid; "|Date
|  style="border-style:none none solid solid; "|Location
|  style="border-style:none none solid solid; "|Notes
|- align=center
|Loss
|align=left|
|align=left| Billy Wayne Lewis
|align=left|KO
|align=left|2
|31/01/1991
|align=left| Bayfront Auditorium, Pensacola, Florida, United States
|align=left|
|-
|Win
|
|align=left| James Campbell
|PTS
|6
|10/10/1990
|align=left| Lake Charles, Louisiana, United States
|align=left|
|-
|Win
|
|align=left| Robert Green
|KO
|4
|17/07/1990
|align=left| Lake Charles, Louisiana, United States
|align=left|
|-
|Win
|
|align=left| James Tarver
|KO
|1
|27/04/1990
|align=left| Rayne, Louisiana, United States
|align=left|
|-
|Loss
|
|align=left| Iran Barkley
|KO
|8
|01/11/1985
|align=left| Felt Forum, New York City, United States
|align=left|
|-
|Loss
|
|align=left| Dwight Walker
|UD
|10
|17/09/1985
|align=left| Tropicana Hotel & Casino, Atlantic City, New Jersey, United States
|align=left|
|-
|Win
|
|align=left| Tyler Dupuy
|UD
|8
|14/05/1985
|align=left| Beaumont, Texas, United States
|align=left|
|-
|Loss
|
|align=left| Murray Sutherland
|TKO
|12
|08/12/1984
|align=left| Arizona Veterans Memorial Coliseum, Phoenix, Arizona, United States
|align=left|
|-
|Win
|
|align=left| Mauricio Hernandez da Cruz
|TKO
|4
|03/11/1984
|align=left| Midtown Neighborhood Center, Kingston, New York, United States
|align=left|
|-
|Win
|
|align=left| Doug Holiman
|TKO
|8
|29/09/1984
|align=left| Sullivan Arena, Anchorage, Alaska, United States
|align=left|
|-
|Loss
|
|align=left| Leroy Hester
|TKO
|10
|05/08/1983
|align=left| Beaumont Civic Center, Beaumont, Texas, United States
|align=left|
|-
|Loss
|
|align=left| Marvelous Marvin Hagler
|KO
|4
|27/05/1983
|align=left| Providence Civic Center, Providence, Rhode Island, United States
|align=left|
|-
|Win
|
|align=left| Frank Fletcher
|UD
|12
|13/02/1983
|align=left| Sands Atlantic City, Atlantic City, New Jersey, United States
|align=left|
|-
|Win
|
|align=left| Bobby West
|TKO
|5
|14/12/1982
|align=left| Gilley's Club, Pasadena, Texas, United States
|align=left|
|-
|Win
|
|align=left| Irving Hines
|PTS
|10
|16/09/1982
|align=left| Port Arthur, Texas, United States
|align=left|
|-
|Win
|
|align=left| Jose Mireles
|TKO
|2
|06/08/1982
|align=left| Houston, Texas, United States
|align=left|
|-
|Win
|
|align=left| Mark Frazie
|UD
|10
|11/07/1982
|align=left| Oasis Ballroom, Tampa, Florida, United States
|align=left|
|-
|Loss
|
|align=left| James Green
|PTS
|10
|14/03/1982
|align=left| Atlantic City, New Jersey, United States
|align=left|
|-
|Win
|
|align=left| Siaosi George Tanoa
|UD
|10
|28/11/1981
|align=left| Caesars Tahoe, Stateline, Nevada, United States
|align=left|
|-
|Loss
|
|align=left| Dwight Davison
|PTS
|10
|08/08/1981
|align=left| Kiamesha Lake, New York, United States
|align=left|
|-
|Win
|
|align=left| Curtis Parker
|PTS
|10
|03/05/1981
|align=left| Brighton Hotel, Atlantic City, New Jersey, United States
|align=left|
|-
|Win
|
|align=left| Willie Ray Taylor
|KO
|5
|13/12/1980
|align=left| Jai Alai Fronton, Miami, Florida, United States
|align=left|
|-
|Win
|
|align=left| Mike Herron
|TKO
|4
|24/10/1980
|align=left| Nassau Coliseum, Uniondale, New York, United States
|align=left|
|-
|Win
|
|align=left| Fermin Guzman
|TKO
|8
|02/10/1980
|align=left| Long Island Arena, Commack, New York, United States
|align=left|
|-
|Loss
|
|align=left| Mustafa Hamsho
|DQ
|10
|15/06/1980
|align=left| Clarkston, Michigan, United States
|align=left|
|-
|Win
|
|align=left| Bob Patterson
|TKO
|6
|25/05/1980
|align=left| Boardwalk Hall, Atlantic City, New Jersey, United States
|align=left|
|-
|Win
|
|align=left| Jerome Jackson
|UD
|8
|23/02/1980
|align=left| Resorts Atlantic City, Atlantic City, New Jersey, United States
|align=left|
|-
|Win
|
|align=left| Norris McKinney
|KO
|3
|09/01/1980
|align=left| Beaumont Civic Center, Beaumont, Texas, United States
|align=left|
|-
|Win
|
|align=left| Willie Classen
|KO
|10
|23/11/1979
|align=left| Felt Forum, New York City, United States
|align=left|
|-
|Win
|
|align=left| Manuel Torres
|KO
|2
|10/10/1979
|align=left| Beaumont Civic Center, Beaumont, Texas, United States
|align=left|
|-
|Win
|
|align=left|Jose Gamez
|KO
|6
|14/09/1979
|align=left| Houston Summit, Houston, Texas, United States
|align=left|
|-
|Win
|
|align=left| German Marquez
|KO
|2
|15/08/1979
|align=left| Beaumont Civic Center, Beaumont, Texas, United States
|align=left|
|-
|Win
|
|align=left| Arnell Thomas
|KO
|2
|26/06/1979
|align=left| Beaumont Civic Center, Beaumont, Texas, United States
|align=left|
|-
|Win
|
|align=left| Jesse Edwards
|KO
|2
|22/05/1979
|align=left| Beaumont, Texas, United States
|align=left|
|-
|Win
|
|align=left| Johnny Heard
|KO
|2
|10/04/1979
|align=left| Beaumont Civic Center, Beaumont, Texas, United States
|align=left|
|-
|Win
|
|align=left| Fred Johnson
|KO
|8
|16/01/1979
|align=left| Houston, Texas, United States
|align=left|
|-
|Win
|
|align=left| Miguel Garcia
|TKO
|4
|28/11/1978
|align=left| Houston, Texas, United States
|align=left|
|-
|Win
|
|align=left| Oscar Rios
|KO
|1
|12/10/1978
|align=left| Pasadena, Texas, United States
|align=left|
|-
|Win
|
|align=left|Carlos Terrazas
|KO
|2
|19/09/1978
|align=left| Houston, Texas, United States
|align=left|
|-
|Win
|
|align=left| Calvin Todd
|KO
|4
|15/08/1978
|align=left| Houston, Texas, United States
|align=left|
|-
|Win
|
|align=left| Dennis Haggerty
|KO
|1
|18/07/1978
|align=left| Houston, Texas, United States
|align=left|
|}

References

External links

1958 births
2014 deaths
Boxers from Texas
Sportspeople from Port Arthur, Texas
American male boxers
Middleweight boxers